Millennium Tower is a 60-story,  residential skyscraper in Boston, Massachusetts, United States. Construction began in 2013 at the site of the former flagship store for Filene's in Downtown Crossing and was completed in 2016. , it is the fifth tallest building in Boston. The building contains 442 condominiums, a Roche Bros. grocery store and Class A office space. Limited occupancy by residents began in July 2016.

History

Initial plans, demolition, and project halt
Millennium Tower and the Burnham Building occupy the space of the former flagship Filene's store. When Filene's closed, the building was put up for sale and was bought by Vornado Realty Trust of New York. Vornado teamed up with Gale International for a $700 million redevelopment of the Filene's site.

As approved in August 2007, the site redevelopment project consisted of a 39-story tower including a 280-room hotel, a 125-seat restaurant,  of office space, 166 residential condos,  of retail space, and an adjacent park. It was originally scheduled for completion by 2011. In order to gut the historic Filene's building and demolish an adjacent building, the project required closing Filene's Basement and the loss of 218 retail jobs.

In Summer of 2008, the developers halted the project, citing the Financial crisis of 2007–08.  As of the halt, demolition was nearly complete, leaving the Burnham building gutted and a large excavation where the non-landmarked parts of the former Filenes complex (built in the 1950s–1970s) had stood. The side of the Burnham building that was exposed by the nearby demolition was temporarily covered with a tarp.  After two years of inactivity, the City of Boston revoked the developer's permits in November 2010.

Ownership change and construction start
In 2012, Millennium Partners took over the task and won approval for a 625-foot tower with 1.2 million square feet (110,000 m2) of commercial and residential space in two buildings.

On April 13, 2013, major tenant Arnold Worldwide was signed to occupy a large part of the new building. With the agreement in place, construction resumed. The building officially broke ground on September 17, 2013 with mayor Thomas M. Menino in attendance. On April 26, 2014, 600 trucks poured  of concrete into a slab for the new building, making it the largest pour in the city's history.

Recent developments and tenants
Tenants, as of 2021, include Roche Bros supermarket.

According to an August 2016 article in the Boston Globe, luxury condos have been purchased by local residents as well buyers from Asia and Europe. A Millennium executive estimated at the time that 75% of the owners will be living in their units in Downtown Crossing.

Gallery

See also

 Filene's Department Store
 List of tallest buildings in Boston

References

External links

 Official website

Financial District, Boston
Residential skyscrapers in Boston
Residential buildings completed in 2016